The Grafton Galleries, often referred to as the Grafton Gallery, was an art gallery in Mayfair, London. The French art dealer Paul Durand-Ruel showed the first major exhibition in Britain of Impressionist paintings there in 1905. Roger Fry's two famous exhibitions of Post-Impressionist works in 1910 and 1912 were both held at the gallery.

History

The date of foundation of the Grafton Galleries is not certain; some sources give 1873, when it had an address in Liverpool. The gallery was incorporated in London on 16 June 1891, and opened in February 1893, first at 8 Grafton Street, and later, from 1896, in Bond Street. The manager was Francis Gerard Prange. From 1905 or earlier, Roger Fry was an advisor to the gallery; he asked William Rothenstein to advise him on exhibition content.

Exhibitions
The first London exhibition of the Grafton Galleries opened on 18 February 1893; the last was probably in 1930. The most celebrated exhibitions held there were Paul Durand-Ruel's Impressionist show of 1905, and the two Post-Impressionist exhibitions put on by Roger Fry: Manet and the Post-Impressionists in 1910–11, and the Second Post-Impressionist Exhibition of 1912.

Exhibitions held at the gallery include:
 1893, February: First exhibition, consisting of paintings and sculpture, by British and foreign artists of the present day
 1893, May: Second exhibition, consisting of the third exhibition of the Society of Portrait Painters, by British and foreign artists of the present day
 1893, November–December: First exhibition of French artists in decorative art
 1894: Fair women
 1894: Fourth exhibition of Grafton Gallery, including a retrospective exhibition of work of Albert Moore, and a general collection of British and foreign works
 1895: Winter exhibition of the works of old Scottish portrait painters, with a selection of the pictures of John Thomson of Duddingston and a collection of old Scottish silver and weapons
 1895: Fair children
 1896: Sixth exhibition of the Society of Portrait Painters
 1896: Pictures representing the loss of Sir John Franklin's expedition to the North Pole, painted by Julius von Payer
 1896, April: Charles Sedelmeyer's fine art exhibition
 1897: Exhibition of dramatic and musical art
 1897: Society of Miniaturists exhibition
 1897: Seventh exhibition of the Society of Portrait Painters
 1897: Summer exhibition of members' work, Society of Miniaturists
 1897, January: Exhibition of the works of Ford Madox Brown
 1898: Catalogue of pictures which belong to 68, Princes Gate
 1898: Collection of pictures by Old Masters formed by David Sellar
 1898: The Gentlewoman photographic competition, exhibition of prize pictures
 1898: Eighth exhibition of the Society of Portrait Painters
 1898, April–May: Exhibition of Australian Art in London
 1898, June: Bibliotheca Lindesiana, manuscripts and examples of metal and ivory bindings exhibited to the Bibliographical Society
 1899: Siegfried Bing, 1838–1905
 1899, January: Vasily Vereshchagin exhibition: Napoleon I, 1812, from a sketch made by an eye-witness
 1899, October–December: Exhibition of modern French art, with a representative collection of the artistic work of Louis Tiffany, of New York
 1900: Fourteenth exhibition of the Ridley Art Club
 1900: Ninth exhibition of the Society of Portrait Painters
 1900, summer: Exhibition of a special selection from the works by George Romney, including a few portraits of Emma, Lady Hamilton by other artists
 1900, December: Exhibition of a second selection from the works by George Romney, including a few portraits of Emma, Lady Hamilton, by other artists
 1901: Exhibition of South African pictures by R. Gwelo Goodman
 1901: Exhibition of works by Willi Wolf Rudinoff (an alias of Wilhelm Morgenstern), including examples in oil, water-colour, etching, and dry point
 1901, March–April: Women's International Art Club, second annual exhibition
 1902: Exhibition of the works of Emil Fuchs
 1902: Works by the late Archibald Stuart Wortley, founder and president of the Society of Portrait Painters
 1902: Portraits by the late Benjamin Constant, and one hundred pencil studies by Violet Manners, Marchioness of Granby
 1902, March: Women's International Art Club, third annual exhibition
 1902, November: Works by Emil Fuchs, the designer of the King Edward VII Coronation Medal and the King's head on the new postage stamps
 1903, January: Women's International Art Club, fourth annual exhibition
 1903, March: Modern Celtic ornament as applied to gold and silver plate, pewter, jewelry, carpets, garden pottery, sundials, etc.
 1903, May: Bijoux et objets d'art exposés par M. René Lalique
 1903, May–July: French masters exhibition
 1904, January: Women's International Art Club, fifth annual exhibition
 1904, December: Women's International Art Club, sixth annual exhibition
 1905, January–February: pictures by Eugène Boudin, Paul Cézanne, Edgar Degas, Édouard Manet, Claude Monet, Berthe Morisot, Camille Pissarro, Pierre-Auguste Renoir and Alfred Sisley, exhibited by Paul Durand-Ruel and Sons, from Paris
 1905: Annual exhibition of the Society of Miniaturists
 1905, March: Exhibition by Emil Fuchs
 1905, May: Exhibition of a selection from the collection of the late James Staats Forbes, including a few works by Jean-Baptiste-Camille Corot, Charles-François Daubigny, Narcisse Virgilio Díaz, Jean-François Millet, Jozef Israëls, Anton Mauve, one of the Maris brothers, and other artists
 1905, December: Women's International Art Club, seventh annual exhibition
 1906: Munich fine art exhibition
 1906, January: Eighth exhibition of the Arts and Crafts Exhibition Society
 1906, July: International Congress of Architects in London
 1906, December: Women's International Art Club, eighth annual exhibition
 1907: Exhibition of paintings and sketches of the Polar regions by Aleksandr Borisov of St. Petersburg
 1907: Exhibition of works by members of the Société des aquarellistes français and the Société des peintres de la marine
 1907, November–December: Special exhibition, United Arts Club
 1908, January: Women's International Art Club, ninth annual exhibition
 1908, February–March: Fourth exhibition of the United Arts Club
 1908, April: Indian princes, Kew Gardens, Italian landscapes, and other pictures
 1908, May–July: Exhibition of paintings by Joaquín Sorolla y Bastida
 1908, October–November: The Franco-British Art Association, joint exhibition of Frits Thaulow, Hippolyte Camille Delpy, Arsène Chabanian
 1908, December: Georges Petit of Paris, second annual London salon of original etchings
 1908: Pictures and drawings in the National Loan Exhibition in aid of the National Gallery Funds
 1910, April–May: Tenth Annual Exhibition of the International Society of Sculptors, Painters and Gravers
 1910, May–June: Exhibition of Fair Women; International Society of Sculptors, Painters and Gravers
 1910: Manet and the Post-Impressionists
 1911, April–May: Eleventh Annual Exhibition of the International Society of Sculptors, Painters and Gravers
 1911, June–July: A Century of Art, 1810-1910
 1912, April–May: Twelfth Annual Exhibition of the International Society of Sculptors, Painters and Gravers
 1912, June–July: Exhibition of Fair Children
 1912: Second Post-Impressionist Exhibition
 1921, April–May: The Annual Exhibition of the International Society of Sculptors, Painters and Gravers; Twenty-seventh London Exhibition
 1922, April–May: The Annual Exhibition of the International Society of Sculptors, Painters and Gravers; Twenty-eighth London Exhibition

Other artists who exhibited at the gallery include Frank Brangwyn, Alfred Egerton Cooper, John Lavery, William Orpen, Christopher Nevinson, Ben Nicholson, Glyn Philpot, William Bruce Ellis Ranken, Frank Salisbury, John Singer Sargent, James Jebusa Shannon and George Fiddes Watt.

The Ridley Art Club held its annual exhibition at the gallery from 1897 to 1919; the Society of Miniaturists held its annual exhibition there from 1905 until 1926; and the Allied Artists' Association held its annual show in the Grafton Galleries from 1916 to 1920.

References

Further reading
 Pamela Fletcher and Anne Helmreich (eds.) (2012). The Rise of the Modern Art Market in London, 1850–1939. Manchester: Manchester University Press

Defunct art galleries in London